Paddy Johnson is a New York-based art critic, blogger, curator and writer. Johnson is the founder and editor of the art blog Art F City (formerly called Art Fag City). Art F City publishes an annual calendar titled "Nude Artists as Pandas," featuring naked artists dressed up in panda costumes.

Early life
Johnson was born in Guelph, Ontario. She was educated at Mount Allison University in Sackville, New Brunswick and continued her education at Rutgers University. She has slowly gained notoriety as an art critic in the New York art scene. She is also known for her live coverage of major art fairs such as the Armory Show, Venice Biennale, Frieze Art Fair, and Art Basel in Miami and Switzerland.

Career
She pens a regular column for L Magazine in New York. Her work has appeared in numerous publications, including ArtReview, Art & Australia, Art in America, artkrush, The Daily Beast, FlashArt, Flavorpill, The Guardian, The Huffington Post, More Intelligent Life, New York Press, NYFA Current, Print Magazine, The Reeler, Time Out NY.

She has worked with Location One as a visiting critic and attended the 2007 iCommons conference in Croatia as a blogger. In 2008, she served on the board of the Rockefeller Foundation New Media Fellowships and became the first blogger to earn a Creative Capital Arts Writers grant from the Creative Capital Foundation which is part of the Andy Warhol Foundation. She has also served on a panel for ArtPrize.

She contributed to the book what's the deal with all the peanut centric aeroplane snacks? published by Paper Monument.

In December, 2011, Johnson was named in a federal libel lawsuit in United States district court for a May, 2011 article she published in Art Fag City, which suggested an art restorer was a forger and committed crimes.

Sound of Art
In November 2010 Johnson released an LP called "Now That's What You Call Net Art", a DJ battle record that compiles mixes based from sounds recorded in art spaces, galleries, and museums in Manhattan and Brooklyn, pitting the neighboring boroughs against each other.
Johnson raised over $11,000 with a Kickstarter campaign to fund the project, calling upon sound art lovers and a cadre of collectors, even offering a dinner with herself and artist glass popcorn, a former art critic, to the highest bidder. Johnson predicts the project will spawn follow-up records, including East Coast vs. West Coast, and Canada vs. USA. Johnson told WNYC's Carolina Miranda that the Brooklyn recordings sound more DIY.

See also
tART Artist Collective

References

External links
 Art F City
 Art F City on Twitter

Living people
People from Guelph
Canadian art critics
Canadian art curators
Canadian bloggers
Year of birth missing (living people)
Canadian women curators